Pavla Topolánková is a Czech politician. She was born in Bohumín, Czech Republic on 7 May 1955. She was the wife of Mirek Topolánek, former Czech Prime Minister.

Pavla Topolánková is the mother of Petra (1979), Jana (1983) and Tomáš (1992) and the grandmother of Karolína (2006) and Štěpán (2008).

She graduated from Brno University of Technology as a mechanical engineer with specialization on thermal treatment. She was a high school teacher and later personal assistant of her husband while he was a senator in the Czech Senate. She strongly supported her husband in his 2003 bid for chairmanship of Civic Democratic Party and in Czech legislative election, 2006. She is also a co-founder of an NGO Becario, aimed at promoting education. 

In Fall 2006, she surprisingly ran for Senate for Jana Bobošíková's party "Politika 21" in the Ostrava district, against the incumbent candidate of Civic Democratic Party (and to a dismay of senior party officials, who suggested that she should rather support her husband in his effort to form a cabinet). She did not pass the first round and the Civic Democratic candidate lost the run-off.

The marriage of Pavla Topolánková and then Czech Prime Minister Mirek Topolánek had been popular topic for Czech media since parliamentary elections in June 2006. After Pavla Topolánková announced her candidacy for Senate in one of city of Ostrava's election districts (against Mirek Topolánek's party colleague), it became obvious that the marriage was in crisis. In January 2007 Topolánek publicly announced that he lives with Lucie Talmanová, his mistress and party colleague. Topoláneks' divorce was finalised in February 2010.

In January 2007, Cardinal Miloslav Vlk praised Pavla Topolánková for striving to maintain her family and her willingness to forgive her husband.

References

External links 
 Personal website (Czech)

1955 births
Living people
People from Bohumín
People from Cieszyn Silesia
21st-century Czech women politicians
Mirek Topolánek